United Nations Security Council resolution 700, adopted unanimously on 17 June 1991, after recalling resolutions 661 (1991), 665 (1991), 670 (1991) and 687 (1991), and noting the report by the Secretary-General it requested, the council, acting under Chapter VII, the Council approved the full implementation of Resolution 687–the arms embargo against Iraq.

The Council called on all states and international organisations to strictly implement the embargo, requesting states to report within 45 days on the measures they have taken the implementation. It also entrusted the Security Council Committee established in Resolution 661 (1990) to monitor the prohibitions against the sale or supply of arms to Iraq and related sanctions. The committee would submit five reports, at 90 days intervals, to the council on the implementation of the resolution.

See also
 Gulf War
 Iraq and weapons of mass destruction
 Iraq disarmament timeline 1990–2003
 Iraq–Kuwait relations
 Sanctions against Iraq
 List of United Nations Security Council Resolutions 601 to 700 (1987–1991)

References

External links
 
Text of the Resolution at undocs.org

 0700
 0700
United Nations Security Council sanctions regimes
Iraq and weapons of mass destruction
1991 in Iraq
June 1991 events
Sanctions against Iraq